The Saturn Award for Best International Film is one of the annual awards given by the American professional organization, the Academy of Science Fiction, Fantasy & Horror Films. The Saturn Awards, which are the oldest film-specialized awards to reward science fiction, fantasy, and horror achievements (the Hugo Award for Best Dramatic Presentation, awarded by the World Science Fiction Society who reward science fiction and fantasy in various media, is the oldest award for science fiction and fantasy films), included the Best International Film category (then named Best Foreign Film) for the first time for the 1980 film year. It was deactivated after 1982, and was revived for the 2006 film year. It is given to a feature-length motion picture from outside the United States of America and/or films in foreign languages, including non-English American films.

Winners and nominees

1970s (Best Foreign Film)

1980s

2000s

2010s

2020s

Countries with most wins
Canada: 4
United Kingdom: 3
South Korea: 3
India: 2

Countries with most nominations (6 or more)

United Kingdom: 27
France: 17
United States: 15
Canada: 10
Germany: 9

Sweden: 8
Australia: 7
South Korea: 7
China: 6
Denmark: 6

External links
 Official site

References

International Film
Film awards for Best Foreign Language Film
Awards established in 1979